The Fadden ministry (Country–United Australia Coalition) was the 28th ministry of the Government of Australia. It was led by the country's 13th Prime Minister, Arthur Fadden. The Fadden ministry succeeded the Third Menzies ministry, which dissolved on 28 August 1941 following the resignation of Robert Menzies as Prime Minister. A subsequent joint meeting of the Coalition parties elected Country leader Fadden as Menzies' successor. The ministry was replaced by the First Curtin ministry on 7 October 1941 after the independent crossbenchers Alexander Wilson and Arthur Coles withdrew their support for the Fadden government and voted with John Curtin and his Labor Party to bring the government down in a de facto no-confidence motion.

Percy Spender, who died in 1985, was the last surviving member of the Fadden ministry; Spender was also the last surviving minister of the first Menzies government and the Fourth Menzies ministry. John McEwen was the last surviving Country minister.

Ministry

Notes

Ministries of George VI
Australian Commonwealth ministries
1941 establishments in Australia
1941 disestablishments in Australia
Cabinets established in 1941
Cabinets disestablished in 1941